John Lloyd Mills Young (born July 4, 1975) is an American actor and singer. In 2006, he won the Tony Award for Best Leading Actor in a Musical for his role as Frankie Valli in Broadway's Jersey Boys. He is the only American actor to date to have received a Lead Actor in a Musical Tony, Drama Desk, Outer Critics Circle and Theatre World Award for a Broadway debut.  Young sang lead vocals on the Grammy Award-winning Jersey Boys cast album, certified Platinum by the Recording Industry Association of America. Young reprised his role as Frankie Valli in Warner Brothers' film adaptation of Jersey Boys, directed by Clint Eastwood and released June 20, 2014.

Young was appointed by President Barack Obama to the President's Committee on the Arts and Humanities. He was sworn-in by Supreme Court Justice Elena Kagan on November 21, 2013. He resigned from the President's Committee in August, 2017, co-signing a letter of resignation that said in reference to President Trump, "Ignoring your hateful rhetoric would have made us complicit in your words and actions."

Early life
Young was born in Sacramento, California, the son of Rosemarie Joan (Cianciola) and Karl Bruce Young, a Strategic Air Command tanker-squadron commander. His mother died when he was two years old. His father had English, Welsh and German ancestry, and his mother was of Italian descent. He was raised partly in Plattsburgh, NY, attending Plattsburgh High School and acting in their drama department. He is a graduate of Brown University.

Career
After moving to New York City, Young worked his way up through the ranks of the theater scene with roles in numerous regional and off-Broadway plays, including the New York-area premiere of Michael Healey's The Drawer Boy with actor John Mahoney; "Charlie" in Julia Jordan's The Summer of the Swans; "Moritz" in the Douglas Langworthy translation of Wedekind's Spring Awakening; and "Claudio" in Rinne Groff's The Five Hysterical Girls Theorem for the Target Margin Theatre.

He was named one of the Best Featured Actors in a Play by the New Jersey Star-Ledger as "Danny Saunders" in Aaron Posner and Chaim Potok's dramatic adaptation of Potok's book, The Chosen, opposite Theodore Bikel, directed by David Ellenstein.

He failed to land the part of Frankie Valli in the pre-Broadway run of Jersey Boys, but a year later and after several more auditions, he was asked to headline the show on Broadway, where he played the role for over two years. During his tenure at Jersey Boys, which now has several companies playing worldwide, Young performed at the White House, Carnegie Hall, Radio City Music Hall, the New York City Marathon, New Year's Eve in Times Square, Yankee Stadium and Macy's Thanksgiving Day Parade. Young's run with Jersey Boys concluded on November 9, 2007, followed shortly thereafter by a sold-out-in-a-day solo concert debut at Lincoln Center.

After moving to Los Angeles, Young starred as Marius in an all-star production of Les Misérables at the Hollywood Bowl and was the first guest star invited to appear on Glee.

Young debuted his visual art in May 2010 in "Food for Thought," a show benefiting AIDS Project Los Angeles, at Willis Wonderland, the home of Young's friend, Grammy-winning songwriter Allee Willis. Young's art is represented by Hollywood's Hamilton-Selway Fine Art Gallery. His first art commission was for famed Beverly Hills, CA, restaurant, Spago.

Young's debut album, "My Turn...", was released on July 3, 2012. The album was executive-produced by Dona R. Miller and Young's Under the Skyway Productions, with production from Tommy Faragher of FOX's hit show, Glee, whose cover of "Teenage Dream" was the first song from the show to reach NO. 1 on the Billboard Charts. The album was expanded and re-released with eight new tracks in 2014.

He made his debut at New York's Cafe Carlyle in February 2013. Young reprised his Frankie Valli role in the Broadway production of Jersey Boys from July 3 - September 30, 2012. In March 2014, Young made his West End Theatre debut, starring in the musical's London production. He reprised the role in director Clint Eastwood's film adaptation of Jersey Boys, which was released in June 2014.

Young's extensive charity work includes frequent appearances with and support of Broadway Cares/Equity Fights AIDS, Cystic Fibrosis Foundation, amfAR, Paul Newman's Hole in the Wall Gang, AIDS Project Los Angeles and the United Service Organization (USO).  Young has been a member of the American Civil Liberties Union since 1995.

He is a practitioner and student of Chinese Chan Buddhism.

Filmography
 Glee (2009)
 Oy Vey! My Son Is Gay!! (2009)
 Jersey Boys (2014)

Awards and nominations

Tony Awards
 Winner - 2006 Best Actor in a Musical Jersey Boys

Drama Desk Awards
 Winner - 2006 Best Actor in a Musical Jersey Boys

Outer Critics Circle Awards
 Winner - 2006 Best Actor in a Musical Jersey Boys

Theatre World Awards
 Winner - 2006 Outstanding Broadway Debut Jersey Boys

Grammy Awards
 Winner - 2006 Best Show Album Jersey Boys

Drama League Award
 Nomination - 2006 Performer of the Year Jersey Boys

References

External links

Official Website

American male film actors
American male musical theatre actors
American male television actors
American people of English descent
American people of German descent
American people of Italian descent
American people of Welsh descent
Drama Desk Award winners
Living people
Tony Award winners
21st-century American male actors
Male actors from Sacramento, California
University of Salamanca alumni
1975 births
Theatre World Award winners
Brown University alumni